Louis-Marie Billé (18 February 1938 – 12 March 2002) was a French clergyman, archbishop of Lyon from 6 September 1998 and a cardinal until his death in office.

Life 
Louis Marie Billé studied Catholic Theology and Philosophy in Luçon, Angers (Catholic University of the West), Rome and Jerusalem, specialising in Biblical Theology. His career in the clergy began on 25 March 1962 when he was ordained priest for the diocese of Luçon.

From 1966 to 1972 he worked as a lecturer at the priests' seminary in Luçon, and from 1972 to 1977 he performed the same task at the seminary of La Roche-sur-Yon.

Pope John Paul II appointed him Bishop of Laval on 10 May 1984, transferring him in 1995 to the diocese of Aix, Arles and Embrun. He would become Archbishop of Lyon on 10 July 1998. On 21 February 2001 he was appointed to the College of Cardinals with the title of Cardinal-Priest of San Pietro in Vincoli. Later in the same year the title of Santissima Trinità al Monte Pincio was transferred to him.

Cardinal Billé died in Bordeaux on 12 March 2002 after a serious illness and was entombed in Lyon cathedral. He was succeeded as Archbishop of Lyon by Bishop Philippe Barbarin.

References

1938 births
2002 deaths
20th-century French cardinals
Catholic University of the West alumni
21st-century French cardinals
Bishops of Laval
Archbishops of Lyon
Burials at Lyon Cathedral
Cardinals created by Pope John Paul II